The Journal of Radiation Protection and Research is a quarterly peer-reviewed scientific journal covering research in radiation protection covering both ionizing radiation and non-ionizing radiation. The journal was established in 1976 as Bangsaseonbang-eohakoeji (English: Journal of Radiation Protection), obtaining its current name in 2016. It is published by the Korean Association for Radiation Protection and the editors-in-chief are Chan Hyeong Kim (Hanyang University), Takeshi Iimoto (University of Tokyo), and Riaz Akber (Safe Radiation Australia). In 2019 it became the official joint publication of three associate societies of the International Radiation Protection Association: the Korean Association for Radiation Protection, the Japan Health Physics Society, and the Australasian Radiation Protection Society.

Abstracting and indexing
The journal is abstracted and indexed in 

 International Nuclear Information System 
 Scopus
 Emerging Sources Citation Index - Web of Science

References

External links

Radiation protection
Physics journals